Duginka is a rural locality (a settlement) in Bobrov, Bobrovsky District, Voronezh Oblast, Russia. The population was 64 as of 2010.

Geography 
Duginka is located on the left bank of the Bityug River, 8 km northeast of Bobrov (the district's administrative centre) by road. Lushnikovka is the nearest rural locality.

References 

Rural localities in Bobrovsky District